Hauroth is an Ortsgemeinde – a municipality belonging to a Verbandsgemeinde, a kind of collective municipality – in the Cochem-Zell district in Rhineland-Palatinate, Germany. It belongs to the Verbandsgemeinde of Kaisersesch, whose seat is in the like-named town.

Geography 

The municipality lies in the Eifel.

History 
In 1103, Hauroth had its first documentary mention in a falsified document as Husenrode. Beginning in 1794, Hauroth lay under French rule. In 1815 it was assigned to the Kingdom of Prussia at the Congress of Vienna. Since 1946, it has been part of the then newly founded state of Rhineland-Palatinate.

Politics

Municipal council 
The council is made up of 8 council members, who were elected by majority vote at the municipal election held on 7 June 2009, and the honorary mayor as chairman.

Mayor 
Hauroth’s mayor is Stefan Schneider.

Coat of arms 
The German blazon reads: Durch einen schräglinken silbernen Wellenbalken von Rot und Grün geteilt. Oben ein durchbrochenes rundbogiges, durch drei gestaffelte, nasenbesetzte Spitzbögen unterteiltes goldenes Fenster. Unten drei goldene Ähren.

The municipality’s arms might in English heraldic language be described thus: A bend sinister wavy argent between gules a window with three staggered lancet arches joined by a semicircular arch Or, and vert three ears of wheat of the third.

The bend sinister wavy refers to the place where the village began, on the Kimpelbach. The charge below this, the three ears of wheat, refers to the village’s founding in the 11th century as an agricultural estate (whose name meant “Huso’s Clearing”). The other charge, a Gothic church window modelled on one in the cloister at Ravengiersburg Monastery refers to a document from this monastery, which says that the Provost of Ravengiersburg transferred, among other things, holdings in Hauroth to Saint Stephen’s Foundation in Mainz in 1103.

The arms have been borne since 16 January 1991.

Culture and sightseeing 

The following are listed buildings or sites in Rhineland-Palatinate’s Directory of Cultural Monuments:
 Saint Bartholomew’s Chapel (Kapelle St. Bartholomäus) – aisleless church, 1950-1951
 Northwest of Hauroth – chapel; inside relief of the Trinity, 18th century; before it a grave cross, 18th century

Further reading 
 Ingeborg Scholz: Hauroth und seine Geschichte. Zur 900-Jahr-Feier eines Eifeldorfes. 2003,

References

External links 
 Municipality’s official webpage 

Cochem-Zell